William Schmidt (10 July 1845 - 3 June 1905) was a private in the United States Army who was awarded the Presidential Medal of Honor for gallantry during the American Civil War. He was awarded the medal on 9 November 1895 for actions performed on 25 November 1863 at the Battle of Missionary Ridge in Tennessee.

Personal life 
Schmidt was born on 10 July 1845 in Tiffin, Seneca County, Ohio. His home of record was Maumee, Ohio. He died on 3 June 1905 and was buried in Lakewood Cemetery (Section 8, Tier E, Grave 74) in Minneapolis, Minnesota.

Military service 
Schmidt enlisted in the Army as a private on 12 September 1861 in Maumee and was mustered into Company G, 37th Ohio Infantry on the same day. The company mustered into service on 2 October 1861 at Camp Dennison near Cincinnati, Ohio.

During his unit's attack on Confederate positions at Missionary Ridge and while under heavy fire, Schmidt volunteered to rescue drummer John S. Kountz, who later also won a Medal of Honor. Kountz had been shot in the left leg and was lying in the line of fire. Despite Kountz saying "Save yourself. I am a goner anyhow", Schmidt picked him up and carried him to safety. This was the first instance of a Medal of Honor recipient saving another recipient.

Schmidt's Medal of Honor citation reads:

References 

1845 births
1905 deaths
People from Ohio
American Civil War recipients of the Medal of Honor
United States Army Medal of Honor recipients